The Pintic is a right tributary of the river Dipșa in Romania. It flows into the Dipșa near Teaca.

References

Rivers of Romania
Rivers of Bistrița-Năsăud County